Awḥad al-Dīn Ḥāmid ibn Abi ʾl-Fakhr Kirmānī (died 21 March 1238) was a Persian poet and Ṣūfī mystic.

Kirmānī studied under Rukn al-Dīn al-Sijāsī and joined the ṭarāʾiq (orders) of Quṭb al-Dīn al-Abharī and Abū Najīb al-Suhrawardī. He traveled from Kirmān through Azerbaijan, Iraq and Syria and met many leading mystics and philosophers of the day, including Shams al-Dīn Tabrīzī, Jalāl al-Dīn Rūmī, ʿUthmān Rūmī, Saḍr al-Dīn al-Qūnawī and Fakhr al-Dīn al-ʿIrāqī. In Damascus, he met Ibn ʿArabī, who exercised a great influence on his ideas. He ended his life a teacher in Baghdad, where he was rewarded by the caliph al-Mustanṣir in 1234/1235. He probably died on 21 March 1238.

Kirmānī's writings belong to the tradition of shāhidbāzī, seeing divine beauty in earthly things. He was criticized for the homoerotic nature of some of his writings. He is the author of Mathnavi Misbāhu'l-arvāh ("the lantern of souls"), which is an allegorical pilgrimage through imaginary towns, bearing some affinity to Dante's Divine Comedy.

Notes

References

Further reading
 E. G. Browne. A Literary History of Persia, Vol. 3. Cambridge University Press, 1928. 
 Lloyd Ridgeon. Awḥad al-Dīn Kirmānī and the Controversy of the Sufi Gaze. Routledge, 2017. 
 Jan Rypka. History of Iranian Literature. Reidel Publishing Company, 1968. 

1238 deaths
Iranian Sufis
Year of birth unknown